Die2Nite is a browser-based, multiplayer survival game created by Motion Twin and played in real time. The objective is to build a town to survive the longest during the assaults from hordes of zombies, which come in larger numbers each day at 23:00 server time.

Gameplay

Overview
Each player plays the part of a citizen in a town with the population of 40. The main goal is for the town, and the individuals, to survive for as long as possible.

Each day, between 23:00 and 23:15, zombies attack the town. If the number of zombies doesn't exceed the town's defense rating, then everyone in town is safe. Otherwise, if any zombies manage to get past the defenses, they randomly attack citizens and terrorize or kill them. However, if the town gate is opened, then the town's defense is useless. The number of zombies increases after each day, so eventually a town will be overrun.

To survive longer, townspeople need to scavenge the land around the town, bring back resources and improve the defenses. However, players are not forced to do this, so how long a town can survive depends heavily on each player's experience and willingness to cooperate, and several individuals' leadership.

The town
Each town has the following basic facilities:
 A Well, from which people can take water.
 A Bank, where resources, weapons, food and other items are contributed by townspeople.
 A Construction site, where resources in the Bank are used to build structures.
 The Gate, which is the only way in and out of town for people. It can only be opened from the inside.
 Houses for each person, where they can improve its defense.

Building
An extensive list of construction projects can be undertaken. Most of them provide improvement to the town's defense rating. The others have varying uses, including but not limited to: increasing the amount of Food and Water available to people, making it safer to scavenge outside and cutting down cost of subsequent projects.

Besides resources, construction projects consume varying amounts of Action Points (AP). Thus, most project requires the contribution of multiple players.

Exploration
After players leave the town gate, they enter The World Beyond. The town is in the middle of a land divided into grids. Moving from each grid consumes 1 AP. On each grid, players can search for, pick up and drop items, and mark the grid to notify other players. After a few items is revealed, the grid becomes Depleted, drastically reduce chances of finding an item as well as item quality.

Further from the town are Buildings and Ruins, which have their own hazards but better rewards. From Ruins, players can acquire Blueprints to unlock advanced construction projects, or find rare items or ingredients.

Characters
Each character begins the day with 6 Action Points, which can be spent on moving around in the world beyond, building the town, among other actions. Action points are replenished by consuming items such as Food, Water, alcohol and drugs. Besides Food and Water, all other consumed items have negative side effects. While they cannot die from hunger, characters can die by Dehydration and have to drink at least once every two days. In addition, water is an effective weapon against zombies. For this reason, water is one of the most important resource of the town.

Characters can suffer (or benefit) from a wide range of status effects, after consuming items or fighting zombies. Many of these effects are either detrimental to the citizens' performance or lead to their deaths.

There are two main types of characters. The basic one, "Residents" can be played for free. The advanced one, Heroes, need to be paid for. In addition, Residents acquiring certain achievements (such as being the last person to die) can win free Hero days. Players in Hero Mode can choose from several classes: Scavenger, Scout, Guardian, Survivalist, Tamer and Technician. Each class has a different set of advantages, from the ability to find more items, to being more effective at defending the town. In addition to class advantages, all Heroes have access to more storage place, more upgrade options to their homes, and various other benefits.

Interactions
The main channel of communicating between players is a town-specific Forum. There, players can set goals, make announcements and debate about the town's development.

In the game itself, players can indirectly trade items (by dropping them on the square occupied by the other player, or putting them in the other's house). On the other hand, stealing from other players' homes can be done, if they are out of town. It is possible to attack other players, although it consumes a large amount of AP. Every player's action is recorded in a log accessed by all townspeople. If a member's actions are deemed disruptive or non-constructive, others can Shun them out of the community, cutting their access to the town's various activities. A shunned player can continue to contribute to the town, or sabotage the town (by poisoning other players, initiating a revolt, etc.). If a gallows is built, disruptive players can be hung.

The lifetime of a town can range between two days and more than a month depending on the skill of the players and their ability to work together.
In 2011, the record to beat rose to 50 days because some players managed to exploit a bug that allowed citizens to become practically invincible (the bug is fixed now). Lasting for that amount of time seems to be impossible following an update that considerably increases the strength of attacks after the 28th day.

Achievements
Each player, instead of having a physical identity, is represented by a "Soul" which is re-incarnated throughout their various "lives". Each of their activities, from building the town to killing zombies, are counted and scored. When a specific number is reached, they receive achievements and distinctions.

Most importantly, players can accumulate "Soul points" by surviving. At 100 points, players can choose to reincarnate to a "Distant Town" or "Hardcore Town", featuring a larger map, more challenging game play and more experienced citizens.

Development 
After a beta-test period, the original French version, Hordes, was officially released on 15 July 2008.  From 1 to 3 December 2008, the game experienced major server problems, which was later referred to as the "Armageddon" when all the towns were destroyed. The Armageddon was actually planned to bring the end of version 1 and the beginning of version 2, which included new objects, new building sites and new gaming possibilities. The players who were around during the Armageddon received special distinctions for the game. The first version of Die2Nite, the official English version of the game, was released on 1 December 2010.  An official Spanish version, titled Zombinoia, has also been released.

Reception

It received a score of 16/20 on the French video game website Jeuxvideo and 13/20 on Gameart.eu. Quintin Smith gave a mostly positive review of the English Beta version on Rock, Paper, Shotgun. He said the "size of the playerbase is perfect" while noting that the fact that the town's gates can only be opened from the inside leaves "potential for passive-aggression".

References

External links

2008 video games
Browser-based multiplayer online games
Motion Twin games
Multiplayer online games
Video games about zombies